“We Like to Party” is a song by Dutch production duo Showtek. It was released on 30 December 2013. In December 2014, Showtek released a vocal version of the song titled “Wasting Our Lives (WLTP)” featuring Tryna.

Track listing

Chart performance

Release history

References 

2013 songs
2013 singles
Showtek songs
Spinnin' Records singles
Songs about parties